The Wiru River is a river in Western New Guinea.

See also
List of rivers of Western New Guinea

References

Rivers of Papua (province)